The discography of American contemporary Christian band Tenth Avenue North, which consists of eight studio albums, four independent albums, one live album, three EPs, and twenty-two singles.

Independent albums 

 2002: Broken Down
 2003: Don't Look Back
 2005: Speaking of Silence
 2006: God With Us EP

Studio albums

EPs

Live albums

Singles

References 

Christian music discographies